The Papua New Guinea Football Association, PNGFA is the governing body of football (soccer) in Papua New Guinea.

The PNGFA is a member of both FIFA and OFC, having FIFA and OFC affiliation in 1966 after being founded in 1962. The PNGFA is a member of the Papua New Guinea Olympic Committee, meaning that the PNGFA has control over the men's and women's PNG Olympic football team.

In club football, they oversee the Papua New Guinea National Soccer League.

History 
The PNGFA was founded in 1962.

In 1966 the PNGFA was one of four founding members of the Oceania Football Confederation.

Association offices first opened in Lae in 1999. The Association’s Academy opened in 2003.

Presidents 

 Wep Kanawi
 Madiu Andrew –2004
 David Chung 2004–2018
 John Kapi Natto 2018-present

Trivia 
 The PNGFA was visited by then FIFA President João Havelange in 1983.

See also 
 Football in Papua New Guinea
 Papua New Guinea National Soccer League

References

External links 
 Official website
 Papua New Guinea at the FIFA website
 Papua New Guinea at OFC site

Papua New Guinea
Football in Papua New Guinea
Sports organizations established in 1962
1962 establishments in Papua New Guinea